Craugastor coffeus is a species of frog in the family Craugastoridae.
It is found in Honduras and possibly Guatemala.
Its natural habitats are subtropical or tropical moist montane forests and plantations .
It is threatened by habitat loss.

References 

coffeus
Amphibians of Honduras
Amphibians of Guatemala
Frogs of North America
Critically endangered fauna of North America
Amphibians described in 1999
Taxonomy articles created by Polbot